Paraphrase is a restatement of the meaning of a text or passage using other words.

Paraphrase may also refer to:
 Paraphrasing of copyrighted material
 Paraphrase mass
 Biblical paraphrase
 Presbyterian paraphrases - traditional Presbyterian church songs
 Paraphrases of Erasmus
 Lunar Paraphrase
 Paraphrase of Shem
 The Heresy of Paraphrase
 The first tome or volume of the Paraphrase of Erasmus vpon the newe testamente
 Paraphrase (computational linguistics) - the automatic generation and recognition of paraphrases